Stapleford Abbotts is a village and civil parish in the Epping Forest district of Essex, approximately  SW of Ongar,  N of Romford and  SSE of Epping. The whole parish is within the M25 motorway.

History
The name of the parish arose because the principal manor was held by the Abbey of Bury St Edmunds from before the Norman Conquest to the Dissolution. A story is recorded in the abbey's registers that the lord of the manor was miraculously cured of a lingering illness in 1013 by the body of St Edmund as it passed back to Bury Abbey from London. In gratitude for being cured, he gave the manor to the abbey, either then or some time later. After the dissolution of the monasteries the manor was in the hands of Sir Brian Tuke and was included when he sold Pyrgo to King Henry VIII in 1544 although Navestock and Stapleford were both subsequently leased to George and Walter Cely, relatives of John Cely who had previously been Paler of the Park of Havering Palace at Havering-atte-Bower.

The population rose from 320 in 1801 to 507 in 1831, then fluctuated within that range until 1921 when it was 391. In the 20th century, there was a gradual increase in population due to new building in the area from the 1930s onwards. In 1951, the population was 731.

Historically Stapleford Abbotts was included in the hundred of Ongar. It formed part of the Ongar Rural District Council from 1894 until that authority was absorbed into Epping and Ongar Rural District Council in 1955. Since the local-government reorganisation of 1974, it has been part of Epping Forest District. The present civil parish retains largely the same boundaries as the parish of the mid-19th century.

Events

In September 1927, the village was the scene of the murder of Police Constable George Gutteridge, who was shot at the roadside by two car thieves, Frederick Browne and William Kennedy, who were later hanged for their crime. Gutteridge Lane is named in his memory.

Geography
The parish is mostly rural and agricultural with a scattering of farms and cottages, much of it is Metropolitan Green Belt protected land. The northern boundary of the parish is formed by the River Roding. The remainder of the parish is crossed by streams that feed into it or form the headwater of the River Rom. The terrain is hilly and 28–90 m (92–295 ft) above sea level (AOD) with most between 35 and 80 m (115 and 262 ft).

The village itself is a straggle of mostly 20th-century housing stretching for about a mile along the elevated Romford to Ongar road from the boundary with Havering-atte-Bower. The medieval church (largely rebuilt in the 19th century) is situated in a relatively isolated position a further mile away from what is now the village, reflecting the fact that it had no single nucleus until the 20th century.

Apart from the village of Stapleford Abbotts, the parish includes the hamlets of Bournebridge, Nuper's Hatch and a small part of Passingford Bridge. Two places use the village's name outside of it: Stapleford Flight Centre which provides sightseeing flights and Stapleford Abbotts Golf Course (see below).

Localities

Bournebridge
Adjoining a farm on the main street to the south is the Bournebridge hamlet. The actual Bourne Bridge crosses the Bourne Brook, which later becomes the River Rom. The one Grade II listed building in the hamlet is the Old The School House. Otherwise it consists of fewer than 20 homes and farms.

Nuper's Hatch
This hamlet ranges in altitude from 60 to 82 m (197 to 296 ft) compared to the village centre's 55 m (180 ft) average. It consists of at least 60 properties centred on Nuper's and Lyng's Farm, in particular the neighbourhood and linear development of Tysea Hill. On the Tysea Hill ridge is Stapleford Abbotts Golf Course, which is across an almost straight north–south divide in the Borough of Brentwood. Six other farms adjoin the main road here, using a hilly terrain. Curtismill Green itself is in the parish, along with a few cottages, including the grade II listed Honeysuckle Cottage. However, most of the hamlet is in Navestock.

Transport
Buses are limited in the area, served by the single Route 375. Route 575 also passes through the area, but offers only one return journey per day.

The nearest railway station is at Romford. There are frequent mainline services from its station to London and East Anglia. Both routes 375 and 575 can be used to reach the station.

Notes and references
Notes 
  
References

Villages in Essex
Civil parishes in Essex
Epping Forest District